Taumarunui railway station is the main railway station in Taumarunui, New Zealand. It was an important intermediate stop with a refreshment room on the North Island Main Trunk line; the subject of the ballad "Taumarunui on the Main Trunk Line" by Peter Cape.

History 
The NIMT was opened to through Auckland to Wellington trains from 9 November 1908, with the first NIMT express trains from 14 February 1909. Trains also ran to Stratford from 1933.

The building opened on 1 December 1903, including cattle-yard, engine-shed, and railway workers' cottages,

In December 1900 the telephone line was extended to Taumarunui. Goods ran between Ongarue and Taumarunui from 2 February 1903, with the line opening on Friday 29 May 1903 and, on Tuesday 1 December 1903, the  line between Poro-O-Tarao and Taumarunui was transferred from the Public Works Department to New Zealand Railways.

Extension southward began with goods to Matapuna from 22 June 1903. The prime minister, Sir Joseph Ward, addressed a crowd of several hundred at Taumarunui on Saturday 8 August 1908, when the first Wellington to Auckland train paused at the station. When regular through trains started on Monday 9 November 1908, southbound passengers stayed overnight at Taumarunui. By 11 January 1909 the General Manager gave permission for passengers to sleep on the trains, owing to lack of accommodation at Taumarunui and Ohakune (for northbound passengers). As well as complaints about the quality and quantity of rooms, there was also praise for Taumarunui boarding houses and hotels. Through expresses started to call during the night at Taumarunui from 14 February 1909, with only 5 minutes at the station.

Refreshment rooms opened on 1 November 1909 and closed on 21 February 1975. In 1920 accommodation was provided for refreshment staff and in 1940 a hostel for female refreshment room staff was added.

The platform was extended in 1905 and alterations made to the stationmaster's house in 1908. Within 2 years the goods shed had been doubled in length.

In 1903 an engine shed was moved from Poro-O-Tarao to Taumarunui.A new goods shed was built by Johnson Brothers Ltd for £30,000 in 1966. The original station was replaced by a two-storey building, officially opened by Prime Minister Robert Muldoon on 10 July 1977. In 2016 the sidings to the north of the station were used to stable 110 former Auckland trains, displaced by electrification.

Services 
Night Limited, Scenic Daylight, Silver Star, Silver Fern, Blue Streak, Northerner and Overlander all stopped at the station. On Friday 21 January 1983 the last passenger train ran between New Plymouth and Taumarunui.  The station closed on 25 June 2012, when the passenger stop was dropped from the Northern Explorer's schedule, except for pre-booked groups of 10+. The stop was reinstated from 4 December 2022.As shown in the table and graph, passengers increased rapidly, reaching a peak in 1923.

References

External links
Picture of a scene outside the station 
Picture of transhipping passengers 
Picture of passengers awaiting transhipping to buses
Early 20th century views of station – north, south
1921 derailment north of Taumarunui - report and photo

Defunct railway stations in New Zealand
Buildings and structures in Manawatū-Whanganui
Rail transport in Manawatū-Whanganui
Railway stations opened in 1903
Railway stations closed in 2012
Ruapehu District
1900s architecture in New Zealand